Roman Jan Lentner (15 December 1937 – 15 March 2023) was a Polish footballer. 

An international player for Poland for many years, he most notably competed in the 1960 Summer Olympics.

He won 8 national titles and 3 domestic cups with Górnik Zabrze during his career.

References

External links

1937 births
2023 deaths
People from Świętochłowice
People from Silesian Voivodeship (1920–1939)
Sportspeople from Silesian Voivodeship
Polish footballers
Association football wingers
Poland international footballers
Olympic footballers of Poland
Footballers at the 1960 Summer Olympics
Górnik Zabrze players
Recipients of the Gold Cross of Merit (Poland)